Matale Railway Station is the terminus railway station on the Matale railway line of Sri Lanka. It is the 65th railway station on the line from Colombo Fort railway station and is located in the Matale District in the Central Province. The station was opened on 14 October 1880 following the construction of a branch line from Kandy to Matale.

Location

Timetable
Trains to Colombo Fort are available at 4:50am and 7:40pm daily. Trains to Kandy are available at 6:40am, 10:15am, 1:55pm, 5:05pm and 6:50pm.

Continuity

References

Railway stations on the Matale Line
Matale
Railway stations opened in 1880
Railway stations in Matale District